Fuscopannaria confusa is a species of lichen belonging to the family Pannariaceae.

It is native to Eurasia and Northern America.

References

confusa
Lichen species
Taxa named by Per Magnus Jørgensen
Lichens of Europe
Lichens of Asia
Lichens of North America
Lichens described in 1991